We Are Fuck You is the debut studio album by The Finger, a punk band created by Ryan Adams and Jesse Malin under the Pseudonyms "Warren Peace" and "Irving Plaza" respectively. The album was released on One Little Indian Records in 2003 and is a collection of two earlier E.P.s recorded in 2002: We Are Fuck You and Punk's Dead Let's Fuck.

Track listing

Personnel
The Finger
Jim Beahm (Colin Burns) - vocals
Warren Peace - guitar
Irving Plaza - bass
Rick O'Shea (Johnny T. Yerington) - drums

2003 debut albums
The Finger (band) albums
One Little Independent Records albums
Ryan Adams albums
Jesse Malin albums